Don Davies  (born January 16, 1963) is a Canadian federal member of Parliament (MP) for the New Democratic Party, representing the riding of Vancouver Kingsway since his election in the 2008 federal election. After the 2019 election, Davies was re-appointed as the NDP critic for Health in the 43rd Parliament.

Life and career 
Davies was born in Edmonton, Alberta. He earned a Bachelor of Arts in political science and a Bachelor of Laws at the University of Alberta. After gaining admission to the Alberta Bar, Davies was employed as a researcher at the Alberta Legislature and then executive assistant for policy and communications to Ray Martin, leader of the Official Opposition of Alberta from 1989 to 1991.

Davies and his family moved to Vancouver in 1991. In 1992 he became the director of Legal Services for Teamsters Canada (Local 31), a position he held until his election to the House of Commons in 2008. In this capacity, Davies represented workers and the union at arbitration panels and before both provincial and federal labour tribunals.

Davies also served on numerous public bodies to improve occupational health and safety and deliver more efficient regulatory systems in the transportation sector. He was chair of the Mount Pleasant Parent Advisory Council and serves as secretary-treasurer of the Meridian Cultural Society, providing public space for childcare, church and cultural events.

Davies has been active with many community organizations, including Tools for Peace, Vancouver Co-op Radio, Lawyers for Social Responsibility, La Quena Cooperative, and the Dickens Community Group. He has also been a local hockey coach, and enjoys playing the violin.

A long-time resident of the Kensington neighbourhood in the Vancouver Kingsway riding, Davies is married to Sheryl Palm, a speech language pathologist at Vancouver Children's Hospital. They have three children and a granddaughter.

Federal politics 
Davies was first elected during the 2008 federal election. He received 15,933 votes, winning the riding by almost 3,000 votes over his nearest competitor. Davies was re-elected in the 2011 election, receiving over 50 percent of the votes cast and winning by 10,300 votes over his nearest competitor. In 2015, he was re-elected for his third term, receiving 46 percent of the vote and leading his nearest competitor by over 8,000 votes. Davies was re-elected in the 2019 federal election, obtaining 49 percent of the vote, and leading his nearest competitor by over 11,000 votes. This makes him the longest-serving MP in the history of the Vancouver Kingsway riding and the first MP to ever win the riding four times.

In the 40th Parliament, Davies served as NDP critic for Public Safety and National Security, vice-chair of the House of Commons Standing Committee on Public Safety and National Security and deputy critic for Western Diversification. In the 41st Parliament, Davies served as Official Opposition critic for Citizenship, Immigration and Multiculturalism, and vice-chair of the House of Commons Standing Committee on Citizenship, Immigration and Multiculturalism, and then as Official Opposition critic for International Trade, deputy critic for Citizenship, Immigration and Multiculturalism, and vice-chair of the House of Commons Standing Committee on International Trade. A member of a number of parliamentary groups, he serves on the executives of the Canada–China, Canada–Philippines, and Canada–Europe Parliamentary Associations, and is a Canadian parliamentary delegate to the Council of Europe.

In the 42nd Parliament, Davies introduced more private member's legislation than any other MP in Canada. This legislation included bills to establish universal pharmacare, a national school nutrition program, and free tuition for students with diverse needs. In the 43rd Parliament, Davies was re-appointed to the Health portfolio. He serves on the Standing Committee on Health and was appointed to the National Security and Intelligence Committee of Parliamentarians. Davies has maintained a stance against the extradition of Meng Wanzhou since her arrest in Vancouver in 2018, claiming political interference in the case by U.S. president Donald Trump.

Electoral record

References

External links 
 Don Davies - Member of Parliament Website

1963 births
Living people
Lawyers in British Columbia
Members of the House of Commons of Canada from British Columbia
New Democratic Party MPs
Politicians from Edmonton
Politicians from Vancouver
University of Alberta alumni
Lawyers in Alberta
21st-century Canadian politicians